Hikari Hirata (born 25 May 1995) is a Japanese professional footballer who plays as a forward for WE League club Nojima Stella Kanagawa Sagamihara.

Club career 
Hirata made her WE League debut on 12 September 2021.

References 

Japanese women's footballers
Living people
1995 births
Women's association football forwards
Association football people from Fukuoka Prefecture
Nojima Stella Kanagawa Sagamihara players
WE League players